Lučić is a Slavic surname, Croatian and Serbian family name. It is a patronymic name of Luka.

There was a historical Lučić family in the Republic of Ragusa.

Notable people with the surname include:

 Antun Lučić (1855–1921), Croatian-born oil explorer
 
 Liljana Lučić (born 1953), Serbian politician
 Miloš Lučić (born 1986), Bosnian Serb politician
 Milan Lucic (born 1988), Canadian ice hockey player of Serbian descent
 Mirjana Lučić (born 1982), Croatian tennis player
 Teddy Lučić (born 1973), Swedish footballer of Croatian descent
 Vladislav Lučić (born 1941), Serbian basketball coach
 Vladimir Lučić (born 1989), Serbian professional basketball player
 Uroš Lučić (born 1983), Serbian professional basketball player
 Željko Lučić (born 1968), Serbian operatic baritone

See also
 Lucić
 Lucius
 Lukić
 Luc (disambiguation)

Croatian surnames
Serbian surnames
Slavic-language surnames
Patronymic surnames